The Anderson Rangers was the final name of a minor league baseball team, located in Anderson, South Carolina, in the early 1970s. The club was a member of the Class A Western Carolinas League and played its home games at Anderson Memorial Stadium.

The team began in 1970 as the Anderson Senators and were affiliated with the Washington Senators through the 1971 season. In 1972, the team became the Anderson Giants after becoming an affiliate of the San Francisco Giants. However the following season, the club became an affiliate with the Detroit Tigers and changed their name once again to the Anderson Tigers.

During their final two season in existence, the club became an affiliate of the New York Mets, as the Anderson Mets and finally the Texas Rangers, as the Anderson Rangers.

Year-by-year record

Notable Anderson alumni

 Jim Clancy (1975) MLB All-Star

 Max Lanier (1972, MGR) 2 x MLB All-Star

 Lee Mazzilli (1974) MLB All-Star

 Rick Waits (1970)
Defunct minor league baseball teams
Baseball teams established in 1970
Baseball teams disestablished in 1975
Defunct Western Carolinas League teams
Professional baseball teams in South Carolina
Detroit Tigers minor league affiliates
New York Mets minor league affiliates
San Francisco Giants minor league affiliates
Texas Rangers minor league affiliates
Washington Senators (1961–1971) minor league affiliates
1970 establishments in South Carolina
1975 disestablishments in South Carolina
Defunct baseball teams in South Carolina
Anderson, South Carolina